The 2020 Saskatchewan Roughriders season was scheduled to be the 63rd season for the team in the Canadian Football League. It would have been the club's 111th year overall, and its 105th season of play. This would have been the second season under head coach Craig Dickenson and general manager Jeremy O'Day.

Training camps, pre-season games, and regular season games were initially postponed due to the COVID-19 pandemic in Saskatchewan. The CFL announced on April 7, 2020 that the start of the 2020 season would not occur before July 2020. On May 20, 2020, it was announced that the league would likely not begin regular season play prior to September 2020. On August 17, 2020 however, the season was officially cancelled due to COVID-19.

Offseason

CFL National Draft
The 2020 CFL National Draft took place on April 30, 2020. The Roughriders had seven selections in the eight-round draft. The team forfeited their third-round pick after selecting Jake Bennett in the 2019 Supplemental Draft. The Roughriders also traded their second-round pick to the Montreal Alouettes in a trade for Philip Blake and Patrick Lavoie. They regained a selection in the trade for Zach Collaros to Toronto.

CFL Global Draft
The 2020 CFL Global Draft was scheduled to take place on April 16, 2020. However, due to the COVID-19 pandemic, this draft and its accompanying combine were postponed to occur just before the start of training camp, which was ultimately cancelled. The Roughriders were scheduled to select seventh in each round with the number of rounds never announced.

Planned schedule

Preseason

Regular season

Team

Roster

Coaching staff

References

External links
 

Saskatchewan Roughriders seasons
2020 Canadian Football League season by team
2020 in Saskatchewan